Pope Formosus (896) was the bishop of Rome and ruler of the Papal States from 6 October 891 until his death on 4 April 896. His reign as pope was troubled, marked by interventions in power struggles over the Patriarchate of Constantinople, the Kingdom of West Francia, and the Holy Roman Empire. Because he sided with Arnulf of Carinthia against Lambert of Spoleto, Formosus's remains were exhumed and put on trial in the Cadaver Synod. Several of his immediate successors were primarily preoccupied by the controversial legacy of his pontificate.

Early career
Probably a native of Rome, Formosus was born around 816. He became cardinal bishop of Porto in 864. Two years later, Pope Nicholas I appointed him a legate to Bulgaria (866). He also undertook diplomatic missions to France (869 and 872).

Upon the death of Louis II of Italy in 875, the nobles elected his uncle Charles the Bald to be the new emperor. Formosus conveyed Pope John VIII's invitation for Charles to come to Rome to be crowned. Charles took the crown at Pavia and received the imperial insignia in Rome on 29 December. The supporters of Louis' other uncle, Louis the German, or Louis's widow, Engelberga, opposed the coronation. Fearing political retribution, many of them left Rome surreptitiously. Formosus fled to Tours after despoiling the cloisters in Rome. On April 19, John VIII called a synod which ordered Formosus and other papal officials to return to Rome. When Formosus did not comply, he was removed from the ranks of the clergy and excommunicated on the grounds that he had deserted his diocese without papal permission, and had aspired to the position of archbishop of Bulgaria. Additional charges included the accusations that he had opposed the emperor; "conspired with certain iniquitous men and women for the destruction of the Papal See"; and had despoiled the cloisters in Rome. The condemnation of Formosus and others was announced in July 876. In 878 the sentence of excommunication was withdrawn after he promised never to return to Rome or exercise his priestly functions.

In 867, while Formosus was serving as legate to the Bulgarian court, Boris I requested that he be named archbishop of Bulgaria. Since the canons forbade a bishop to change sees, the request was denied. As early as 872 he was a candidate for the papacy; Johann Peter Kirsch suggests that the pope may have viewed the cardinal as a potential rival. In 883, John VIII's successor, Marinus I, restored Formosus to his suburbicarian diocese of Portus. Following the reigns of Marinus, Adrian III (884–885) and Stephen V (885–891), Formosus was unanimously elected pope on 6 October 891.

Papacy

Shortly after his election, Formosus was asked to intervene in the Patriarchate of Constantinople, where Photius I had been ejected and Stephen I, the son of Emperor Basil I, had taken the office. Formosus refused to reinstate those who had been ordained by Photius, as his predecessor, Stephen V, had nullified all of Photius' ordinations. However, the Eastern bishops determined to recognize Photius' ordinations nonetheless. Formosus also immediately immersed himself in the dispute between Odo of Paris and Charles the Simple for the French throne. Siding with Charles, Formosus zealously exhorted Odo to cede the throne to Charles, to no avail.

Formosus was deeply distrustful of Guy III of Spoleto, the reigning emperor, and began looking for support against him. To bolster his position, Guy forced Formosus to crown his son Lambert as co-emperor in April 892. The following year, however, Formosus persuaded Arnulf of Carinthia to advance to Rome and liberate Italy from Guy's control. In 894, Arnulf's army occupied all the country north of the Po River. Guy died in December, leaving his son Lambert in the care of his mother, Agiltrude, an opponent of the Carolingians. In autumn 895 Arnulf undertook his second Italian campaign, progressing to Rome by February and seizing the city from Agiltrude by force on February 21. The following day, Formosus crowned Arnulf as emperor in St. Peter's Basilica. The new emperor moved against Spoleto but was struck with paralysis on the way and was unable to continue the campaign.

During his papacy, Formosus also had to contend with the Saracens, who were attacking Lazio. On 4 April 896, Formosus died. He was succeeded by Boniface VI, whose papacy lasted 15 days.

Legacy

Stephen VI, the successor of Boniface VI, influenced by Lambert and Agiltrude, sat in judgment of Formosus in 897, in what is known as the Cadaver Synod. The corpse was disinterred, clad in papal vestments, and seated on a throne to face all the charges from John VIII. The verdict was that the deceased had been unworthy of the pontificate. The  was applied to Formosus, all his measures and acts were annulled, and the orders conferred by him were declared invalid. The papal vestments were torn from his body, the three fingers from his right hand he had used in blessings were cut off, and the corpse was thrown into the Tiber, later to be retrieved by a monk.

Following the death of Stephen VI, Formosus' body was reinterred in St Peter's Basilica. Further trials of this nature against deceased persons were banned, but Sergius III (904–911) reapproved the decisions against Formosus. Sergius demanded the re-ordination of the bishops consecrated by Formosus, who in turn had conferred orders on many other clerics, causing great confusion. Later, the validity of Formosus' pontificate was re-reinstated. The decision of Sergius with respect to Formosus has subsequently been universally disregarded by the Catholic Church, since Formosus' condemnation had little to do with piety and more to do with politics.

References

Footnotes

Bibliography

 
 
 
  This article incorporates text from this public-domain publication.

Further reading

 

810s births
896 deaths
9th-century popes
Diplomats of the Holy See
Italian popes
People from Ostia (Rome)
Popes
People temporarily excommunicated by the Catholic Church
Heads of government who were later imprisoned
Clergy from Rome
Burials at St. Peter's Basilica